Újhartyán is a small town in Pest County, Hungary.

Sights

There is a Roman Catholic church in the main street.

References
 Újhartyán on utazom.com

Populated places in Pest County
Hungarian German communities